The 1996–97 Murray State Racers men's basketball team represented Murray State University during the 1996–97 NCAA Division I men's basketball season. The Racers, led by second-year head coach Mark Gottfried, played their home games at Racer Arena in Murray, Kentucky as members of the Ohio Valley Conference. They finished the season 20–10, 12–6 in OVC play to finish second in the OVC regular season standings. They defeated  to win the OVC tournament to advance to the NCAA tournament. As No. 15 seed in the Southeast region, the Racers were beaten by No. 2 seed Duke, 71–68.

Roster

Schedule and results

|-
!colspan=9 style=| Regular season

|-
!colspan=9 style=| Ohio Valley Conference tournament

|-
!colspan=9 style=| NCAA tournament

|-

References

Murray State Racers men's basketball seasons
Murray State
Murray State
Murray State
Murray State